David Spencer Fox was a Michigan politician.

Early life
In 1817, Fox was born in Warren County, Pennsylvania.  His grandfather was a Revolutionary War soldier.  He gained employment with a shingles manufacturing company.  He came to Michigan in 1846.  In Flint, He became a partner of Walker & Begole, a shingles manufacturer, timber land speculation and logging firm.

Political life
Fox first was elected to serve the first ward on the Flint City Council in 1862 and 1863.  He was elected as mayor of the City of Flint in 1871 serving two 1-year terms.

Post-Political life
In 1880, Fox became president of the First National Bank.   He also became involved with the Flint Wagon Works, which later acquired by the Chevrolet Motor Company.  He died in 1901 and was buried at Glenwood Cemetery, Flint, Michigan.

References

Mayors of Flint, Michigan
1817 births
1901 deaths
Burials at Glenwood Cemetery (Flint, Michigan)
Michigan city council members
American bank presidents
19th-century American politicians
19th-century American businesspeople